Lordswell Field or Lord's Well Field is a  biological Site of Special Scientific Interest in Eriswell in Suffolk. It is a Nature Conservation Review site, Grade I. 

This area of calcareous Breckland heath has a rich variety of flora including two nationally rare plants, spanish catchfly and perennial knawel, the latter of which is protected under Section 13 of the Wildlife and Countryside Act 1981. There is also an area of lichen heath.

There is access from the B1112 road.

References

Sites of Special Scientific Interest in Suffolk
Nature Conservation Review sites